In military terms, 139th Division or 139th Infantry Division may refer to:

 139th Division (Imperial Japanese Army)
 139th Rifle Division (Soviet Union)